This article is the discography of French rumba flamenca band Gipsy Kings.

Albums

Studio albums

Live albums

Cast recording albums

Compilations albums

Video albums

Singles

Notes

References

Discographies of French artists